Ebhausen is a town in the district of Calw in Baden-Württemberg in Germany.

History
The municipality of Ebhausen was formed in 1975 by the merging of Ebhausen, Ebershardt, Rotfelden, and Wenden in 1975.

Geography
The municipality (Gemeinde) of Ebhausen is located at the center of the district of Calw, in the German state of Baden-Württemberg. Elevation above sea level in the municipal area ranges from a high of  Normalnull (NN) to a low of  NN.

A portion of the Federally protected  nature reserve is located in Ebhausen's municipal area.

Politics
Ebhausen has four boroughs – , Ebhausen, and  – and three villages: Gärtenfeld, Schwarzenbachmühle, Ziegelhütte. Also in the municipal area are the industrial district of Wöllhausen and the abandoned villages of Berghäuser, Grashart, and Höfen.

Coat of arms
Ebhausen's municipal coat of arms is divided party per pale into a yellow half, which contains a black woodcutting axe, on the left and a black half on the right. Both are crossed by a red line. Sans the axe, this was the coat of arms of the Houses of Wolthausen and Vogtsberg, who ruled over Ebhausen and Wenden as vogts respectively. The axe is lifted from the arms of a local noble, Wetzel von Ebhausen, and the tincture from the arms of Rotfelden. This coat of arms was awarded along with a municipal flag by the Calw district office on 10 February 1984.

Transportation
Ebhausen is connected to Germany's network of roadways by the Bundesstraße 28.

References

External links

  (in German)

Calw (district)